Sean Robert Jamieson (born March 2, 1989) is a Canadian former professional baseball infielder.

Career
Jamieson attended Holy Trinity Catholic Secondary School in Simcoe, Ontario and then Niagara County Community College where he maintained a 3.98 grade point average and won a NJCAA Division III Gold Glove award in 2009. After two years at NCCC, Jamieson accepted a full scholarship offer to play at Canisius over competing offers from South Florida and Pittsburgh. Jamieson was named the Metro Atlantic Athletic Conference Co-Player of the Year as well as the MAAC Male Student-Athlete of the Year and was also selected for the Capital One Academic All-America Second-Team in 2011.

The Oakland Athletics selected Jamieson in the 17th round of the 2011 MLB draft. The Athletics traded him to the Arizona Diamondbacks for Stephen Drew in August 2012. He played for the Canadian national baseball team in the 2015 Pan American Games and 2015 WBSC Premier12.

Jamieson retired from baseball in June 2017.

References

External links

1989 births
Living people
Baseball infielders
Baseball people from Ontario
Baseball players at the 2015 Pan American Games
Burlington Bees players
Canada national baseball team players
Canadian expatriate baseball players in the United States
Canisius Golden Griffins baseball players
Mobile BayBears players
Pan American Games gold medalists for Canada
Pan American Games medalists in baseball
Reno Aces players
South Bend Silver Hawks players
Sportspeople from Kitchener, Ontario
Vermont Lake Monsters players
Visalia Rawhide players
Medalists at the 2015 Pan American Games